Rhododendron vialii (红马银花) is a rhododendron species native to Laos, Vietnam, and southern Yunnan, China, where it grows at altitudes of . The flowers are dark red.

References

vialii
Flora of China
Flora of Laos
Flora of Vietnam
Flora of Yunnan